Georgios I (also George I) was a ruler of the Nubian state of Makuria (c. AD 860 - 920). The events about the king are preserved in the writings of the Egyptian historians Al-Maqrizi, al-Balawi and Ibn Taghribirdi. Their description of the events is not always conclusive and they provide at several points contradictory information, making it difficult for modern historian to reconstruct the events.

Reign

In his youth, his father Zacharias III appointed him co-regent and dispatched him on the long journey to Baghdad.
For several years Egypt had been wracked by the Fourth Fitna and Zacharias had halted payments of the baqt. Once Ibrahim had gained control over Egypt he demanded the baqt be resumed and the payment of all arrears. In an attempt to reduce these demands, Georgios was sent to meet the Caliph. It is not certain if he traveled all the way to Baghdad or whether he simply went to Cairo; either way his journey had a major effect, and a new treaty was signed canceling the arrears and changing the terms of the baqt so that it only needed to be paid once every three years.

There is another story of Georgios being captured in his youth and brought to Baghdad as a prisoner. It is possible, but unlikely, that he made the journey twice. It is also possible that in this story he was confused with another person.

During Georgios' long reign the Arab adventurer Abu al-Rahman al-Umari invaded the gold mining area near Abu Haman with his private army. Georgios dispatched his nephew and heir Niuty to battle him, but Niuty rebelled. Georgios sent one of his sons, but he was defeated and forced to flee to Alodia. Another son, Zacharias, was dispatched, defeated once by Niuty's forces he allied himself with al-Umari and defeated Niuty. He then turned on al-Umari forcing him back to the north.

References

Nubian people
Kingdom of Makuria
9th-century monarchs in Africa

10th-century monarchs in Africa
860s births
920 deaths
Year of birth uncertain